Agent 47 is a fictional character, the protagonist and the player character of the Hitman video game franchise, developed by IO Interactive. He has been featured in all games of the series, as well as various spin-off media, including two theatrically released films, a series of comics, and two novels. Agent 47 has been voiced by actor David Bateson in the video game series since its inception in 2000. 

A monotone and seemingly emotionless contract killer, the player controls 47 as he travels around the world to execute hits on various criminals that are assigned to him by Diana Burnwood, his handler within the fictional International Contract Agency (ICA). The character takes his name from being the 47th clone created by various wealthy criminals from around the world, in the hopes of creating an army of obedient soldiers to carry out their commands. As one of the last clones to be created, 47 is among the most skillful, and manages to escape his creators before finding employment with the ICA. 

Agent 47 has been positively received by critics for his moral ambiguity and nuanced characterization. Alongside other gaming characters with similar traits, such as Lara Croft, Sam Fisher, and Solid Snake, he is considered one of the most popular and significant characters in video games.

Concept and creation
According to Jacob Andersen, lead designer of Hitman 2: Silent Assassin, Agent 47 went from being "a mean old hairy guy" to having "hi-tech glasses" before getting to his current design. More inspiration came from "comic books, Hong Kong movies" and other similar media. According to game director Rasmus Højengaard, the idea of a clone whose future is decided by the people that created him intrigued the Hitman team. He felt that the idea of creating the "ultimate assassin" by cloning evolved with the character before the first game was completed. The character of 47 is voiced in the video game series by David Bateson, who the appearance of 47 is based on.

Appearance

Agent 47 has a tattoo on the back of his head in the style of a barcode. The creators of Hitman have been noted saying that they decided to include a tattoo on the back of his head to "give players something to look at" since 47 is bald. In game, the reason for this tattoo is to ID him among the other clones.   
47's typical attire consists of a black suit, black leather gloves and shoes, white dress shirt, and a burgundy tie. As the Hitman series allows players the option of engaging in stealth-based strategy to avoid conflict, 47 has the ability to exchange his stock costume (assigned to 47 at the beginning of a level or displayed in a cut scene) with various characters in the game to avoid detection. There are a wide variety of costumes to choose from including police, military, medical, and culinary uniforms that are all made available by incapacitating or killing non-player characters and stealing their clothing.

47 is completely bald with pale skin and blue eyes with dark eyebrows. It is apparent that 47 grows older, evident by the added wrinkles through the course of the first four games. He significantly aged in Absolution, with many wrinkles on his face, him performing certain actions slower, and other reduced abilities. This is retconned in the 2016 game as 47 appears much younger, with him looking exactly the same in the game's main sections and prologue which takes place 20 years before, when he was inducted into the ICA. A medical report on 47 in-game states that although 47 is in his 50s, his body is still in peak condition as if he is in his 20s, and he is completely immune to disease. Since players of the video game series control the character from a third person perspective, the barcode that is tattooed on the back of his head is starkly prominent, although he has his head covered by a bandage for most of Hitman: Absolution after he removes it in an attempt to disguise himself.
47's barcode acts as a security key to access areas of the facility where he was created and trained. His barcode is implied to be in Code 39; according to Dr. Ort-Meyer's journal, the barcode was added to the tattoo in 1975, one year after the code was developed.

Alternative stock costumes are occasionally provided. In Hitman: Codename 47, he is seen wearing a guerrilla camouflage in the jungle, while in Silent Assassin Agent 47 wears a protective anorak in the Japanese mountains and a blue turban in Afghanistan. At the end of Hitman: Blood Money, Agent 47 wears a white suit and white gloves while he is placed into a coffin during his funeral. The World of Assassination trilogy depicts various level specific outfits, as well as a few bonus ones. These outfits sometimes include a red, white and/or black theme in reference to the colors of his suit. In addition to clothing, Agent 47's distinctive choice of weaponry plays an important role in his appearance. He prefers to use a pair of silver customized AMT Hardballers, a M1911 clone, nicknamed "Silverballers". Following Hitman: Contracts, the Hitman symbol replaces the Silverballer logos that are typically printed on the side of the pistol's slide. Throughout the franchise, the Silverballers serve as Agent 47's signature weapon, along with his fiber wire garrote, appearing in every game of the series. In the World of Assassination, 47 is often also seen wield a black silenced 1911 in artworks and cutscenes, (however the Silverballer is also an unlockable).

Personality

47's priority is completing his contract. He will eliminate his target no matter what, although it remains a part of his dedication to professionalism to avoid any unnecessary collateral damage, only sacrificing innocents if he must. He is emotionally closed off to the suffering of others when appropriate on a contract, even if they remind him of himself at a younger age. He is very quiet and monotone to the point of being socially awkward, which is perhaps the biggest of his very few weaknesses. He generally speaks in an eloquent, non-threatening tone, very rarely swearing or even raising his voice. He also has a blank and somewhat sinister facial expression, often scanning the scene with his eyes; the only other facial expression he has been known to show is pain, though he occasionally smirks in the 2007 film adaptation. 47 seems to also be an accomplished conversationalist despite the fact that he is extremely reserved, often able to fool and manipulate people with convincing lies. Hitman: Enemy Within shows that he has the capability to act far out of his normal personality to imitate people, such as when he pretends to be a cocky womanizing biker.

Nevertheless, 47 can blend into the crowd and play the role of a regular person very effectively and efficiently. He is content with being alone but has a deep, if unexpressed, admiration for the few people he becomes close toespecially Diana Burnwood, Father Emilio Vittorio, Helen McAdams, Victoria, Tommy Clemenza, Lucas Grey, and Mei Ling. 47 also shows uncharacteristic sensitivity towards animals that he keeps as pets, such as his childhood rabbit and mouse during his time in the asylum, and a yellow canary in Hitman: Blood Money (though he is not hesitant to kill the canary in order to avoid giving his position away to authorities). He very rarely shows the same care towards human beings, though he has expressed disgust at exploiting innocent people, as mentioned during the briefing in "Death Factory", when he lamented at how Travis and Blake Dexter used "children as weapons".

47's personality has changed slightly from his initial inception in Hitman: Codename 47. In said game, he talks about as much as or slightly less than a regular person. This version of 47 is depicted from the original game to certain sections of Hitman: Blood Money. Starting in 2012 with the release of Hitman: Absolution, he has since become a quiet man of very few words. He rarely talks unless during a cutscene or to an NPC during a mission if necessary. In the film adaptations based on the games, 47 is far more talkative: uncharacteristically verbose in the 2007 film, sardonic and impatient in the 2015 reboot.

Both Hitman novels and some portions of Hitman: Absolution show a side of 47 rarely seen. When out of his element or not on assignment, 47 occasionally shows behavior similar to ordinary people. In Hitman: Enemy Within, he is shown swearing when frustrated, as well as sharing a joke with Diana. More often than not, he prefers to keep to himself. 47 is assumed to be a multi-millionaire from his contract earnings, but never stops accepting new contracts. Due to the nature of his work he only spends his money on simple things like food, clothes, shelter, and job-related equipment, although he is also known to donate some of it to Vittorio and his parish. He does have a particular taste for fine dining and expensive clothing, and it is implied in Blood Money and Absolution that all of his suits are professionally custom-tailored.

Reception 
In 2012, GamesRadar+ ranked Agent 47 as 47th "most memorable, influential, and badass" protagonist in video games. He is regarded by GamesRadar+, FHM, The Telegraph, Play, and G4 as one of the best assassins in video games. IGN ranked him as gaming's fourth "most notorious" anti-hero, while The Telegraph ranked him third on their list of top 10 video game anti-heroes. Complex ranked him as the 5th "best assassin and hitman in video games", noting him as the "original contract killer", while also praising his outfit as "stylish". Empire ranked him as the 21st "greatest video game character", stating that his design was "striking". Rolling Stone ranked Agent 47 among the most iconic video game characters of the 21st century.

Appearances

Video games
Hitman: Codename 47 (2000)
Hitman 2: Silent Assassin (2002)
Hitman: Contracts (2004)
Hitman: Blood Money (2006)
Hitman: Absolution (2012)
Hitman Go (2014)
Hitman: Sniper (2015)
Hitman (2016)
Hitman 2 (2018)
Hitman 3 (2021)

Films
Hitman (2007) 
Hitman: Agent 47 (2015)

Novels
Hitman: Enemy Within
Hitman: Damnation

Comics
Agent 47: Birth of the Hitman series

References

Further reading

Action film characters
Action-adventure game characters
Adoptee characters in video games
Clone characters in video games
Fictional assassins in video games
Fictional aviators
Fictional characters without a name
Fictional contract killers
Fictional criminals in video games
Fictional eskrimadors
Fictional flexible weapons practitioners
Fictional fugitives
Fictional gunfighters in video games
Fictional hapkido practitioners
Fictional horticulturists and gardeners
Fictional karateka
Fictional kenpō practitioners
Fictional kickboxers
Fictional Krav Maga practitioners
Fictional marksmen and snipers
Fictional martial artists in video games
Fictional mass murderers
Fictional patricides
Fictional Romanian people
Fictional secret agents and spies in video games
Fictional super soldiers
Fictional taekwondo practitioners
Fictional torturers
Genetically engineered characters in video games
Hitman (franchise)
Male characters in video games
Orphan characters in video games
Square Enix protagonists
Video game characters introduced in 2000
Video game characters who can move at superhuman speeds
Video game characters with slowed ageing
Video game characters with superhuman strength
Video game mascots
Vigilante characters in video games